John Harte McGraw is an outdoor 1912 bronze sculpture depicting the former governor of the same name by Richard E. Brooks, installed in McGraw Square at the intersection of Fifth Avenue and Olive Street in Seattle, in the U.S. state of Washington.

Description
The statue measures approximately  x  x  and rests on a granite base that measures approximately  x  x .

History
The work was surveyed and deemed "well maintained" by the Smithsonian Institution's "Save Outdoor Sculpture!" program in June 1995.

See also

 1912 in art

References

1912 establishments in Washington (state)
1912 sculptures
Bronze sculptures in Washington (state)
Granite sculptures in Washington (state)
Monuments and memorials in Seattle
Outdoor sculptures in Seattle
Sculptures of men in Washington (state)
Statues in Seattle